The Amnesty Act of 1872 is a United States federal law passed on May 22, 1872, which removed most of the penalties imposed on former Confederates by the Fourteenth Amendment, adopted on July 9, 1868. Section 3 of the Fourteenth Amendment prohibits the election or appointment to any federal or state office of any person who had held any of certain offices and then engaged in insurrection, rebellion, or treason.  However, the section provided that a two-thirds vote by each House of the Congress could override this limitation. The 1872 act was passed by the 42nd United States Congress and the original restrictive Act was passed by the United States Congress in May 1866.

Specifically, the 1872 Act removed office-holding disqualifications against most of the secessionists who rebelled in the American Civil War, except for "Senators and Representatives of the thirty-sixth and thirty-seventh Congresses, officers in the judicial, military, and naval service of the United States, heads of departments, and foreign ministers of the United States."

In the spirit of the act, then United States President Ulysses S. Grant, by proclamation dated June 1, 1872, directed all district attorneys having charge of proceedings and prosecutions against those who had been disqualified by the Fourteenth Amendment to dismiss and discontinue them, except as to persons who fall within the exceptions named in the act. President Grant also pardoned all but 500 former top Confederate leaders.

The 1872 law cleared over 150,000 former Confederate troops who had taken part in the American Civil War.

Text 
Be it enacted by the Senate and House of Representatives of the United States of America in Congress assembled (two-thirds of each house concurring therein), that all political disabilities imposed by the third section of the fourteenth article of amendments of the Constitution of the United States are hereby removed from all persons whomsoever, except Senators and Representatives of the thirty-sixth and thirty-seventh Congresses, officers in the judicial, military, and naval service of the United States, heads of departments, and foreign ministers of the United States.

Post-Civil War application 
The Amnesty Act of 1872 states only that all political disabilities imposed by the Fourteenth Amendment "are hereby removed," with no mention as to whether future disabilities under the same are to be considered removed. It is unknown and unclear whether this Act also automatically removes disability for subsequent actions that violate Section 3 of the Fourteenth Amendment. That section has been invoked only twice since the American Civil War: in 1919 and 1920, it blocked Victor L. Berger, a member of the Socialist Party who had won both elections, from taking office as the Representative from Wisconsin because he had been convicted of violating the Espionage Act of 1917. Although Section 3 was applicable to Berger, it does not appear that the Amnesty Act of 1872 was considered.

In 2022, one federal district court ruled that the Act applies to current members of Congress, automatically removing the political consequences of an alleged violation of the third section, though that district court ruling was later reversed by the United States Court of Appeals for the Fourth Circuit. Another federal district court ruled that the Act does not apply to current members of Congress, and that the third section is still applicable.

See also 
 Fourteenth Amendment to the United States Constitution
 Compromise of 1877

Notes

1872 in American law
Reconstruction Era
42nd United States Congress
United States federal legislation articles without infoboxes